Rail transport in Tasmania consists of a network of narrow gauge track of  reaching virtually all cities and major towns in the island state of Tasmania, Australia. Today, rail services are focused primarily on bulk freight, with no commercial passenger services being operated. The mainline railways of Tasmania are currently operated by TasRail, a Government of Tasmania-owned Corporation, who owns and maintains both rolling stock, locomotives, and track infrastructure.

Traffic
Tasmania has a small rail system by world standards.  It currently carries no regular passenger services.  Freight services are supported (in part) by state government funding.  The main cargo carried is cement, which is carried from Railton to the port at Devonport. Other major commodities carried are coal, logs, containers and newsprint.

History

Routes

A  "Irish gauge" railway line was opened between Deloraine and Launceston on 10 February 1871 by the private Launceston and Western Railway, on the basis of debt guarantees from landowners who stood to benefit.  The line went bankrupt in 1872 and was taken over by the Tasmanian Government on 31 October 1873, which then attempted to recover the debt from the guarantors, leading to civil unrest.

On 1 March 1876, another private railway, the Tasmanian Main Line Company, which was guaranteed by the Tasmanian Government, opened a narrow gauge  line from Hobart to Evandale, near Launceston. A further extension, opened on 1 November 1876, connected with the Launceston and Western Railway at a break-of-gauge at Western Junction with the line to Deloraine, however the line between Western Junction and Launceston was made dual gauge.  The line between Western Junction and Deloraine was converted to dual gauge on 17 March 1885. On 30 May 1885, the line was extended to Devonport.

The Launceston - Deloraine was converted to solely narrow gauge on 18 August 1888, creating a single narrow gauge network. On 1 October 1890 the Tasmanian Government bought the Tasmanian Main Line Company, creating the Tasmanian Government Railways. On 15 April 1901 the Devonport line was extended to Burnie, connecting with the Emu Bay Railway's line to Zeehan, which was completed on 21 December 1900. The government railway was extended to Wynyard on 1 February 1913. The line was extended to Wiltshire Junction on 12 July 1922, connecting with the already existing line between Stanley and Smithton.

Trains no longer operate out of Hobart and under current plans the mainline will be severed from Hobart by 2024 with building of new road only bridge across Derwent replacing existing dual road-rail bridge.

Principal branch lines
Mole Creek Line - A branch line was opened from Deloraine (Lemana Junction) to Mole Creek on 5 April 1890. This line closed on 6 February 1985.
Scottsdale Line - Opened from Launceston to Scottsdale on 9 August 1889 and extended to Branxholm on 12 July 1911 and Herrick on 15 March 1919.(currently closed).
Fingal Line - Opened from Conara Junction (on the Hobart - Launceston line) to St Marys on 29 June 1886.(terminates at Fingal).
Oatlands Line - Opened from Parattah to Oatlands on 13 May 1885. The line closed on 10 June 1949.
Derwent Valley Line - Opened from Bridgewater to New Norfolk on 1 September 1887 and was extended to Glenora on 22 July 1888. The ultimate terminus of Derwent Valley line was Kallista which was reached on 6 July 1936.(currently closed)
Bellerive-Sorell Line - This isolated line was built between Bellerive and Sorell on the eastern shore of the Derwent River on 2 May 1892. It closed on 30 June 1926.
Strahan–Zeehan Line - This isolated line was built between Zeehan and Regatta Point opened on 4 February 1892. The line was fully closed on 25 January 1963.
Melrose Line - Opened between Don Junction and Paloona on 10 April 1916 and extended to Barrington on 23 September 1923. The line was completely closed back to the junction on 16 October 1963, but the section from Don Junction to Don Township was reopened on 20 November 1976 by the Don River Railway.
Bell Bay Line - Built between Launceston and Bell Bay on 17 May 1974 to access the industries established there, including shipping. This Line was included in the Federal Government's AusLink initiative. It is the proposal that this line be converted to standard gauge to facilitate the transfer of mainland railway wagons direct to Bell Bay and Launceston, however no further action has been forcoming to date.

The former Emu Bay Railway 

The earlier lines of the West Coast, Tasmania were independent of the main Tasmanian Railway system when built, but most connected to the Emu Bay Railway.  The North Mount Lyell Railway and a few other smaller lines were not connected to the Emu Bay line.

The Emu Bay Railway was purchased by Australian Transport Network on 22 May 1998, thus merging that line with the remainder of the system that company then operated. Today known as the Melba line, it was excluded from the 2007 lease arrangement.

Operators
Historically, all the mainline railways were operated by the Tasmanian Government Railways, which was absorbed into the Australian National Railways Commission in 1978 and renamed TasRail. In November 1997, TasRail was sold to the Australian Transport Network, a partnership of New Zealand based Tranz Rail and United States railroad Wisconsin Central. This sale also included a 50-year lease of the Crown land on which the Tasmanian railway network was situated. Tasrail was granted the exclusive right to use and occupy the land, but owned the infrastructure situated on that land and was obliged to maintain at its own cost.

In 2004, the railway was purchased by Pacific National following the purchase of Tranz Rail by Toll Holdings, and the sale of Wisconsin Central's overseas investments as a result of that railroad's takeover by Canadian National. In September 2005, Pacific National angered the Tasmanian State Government and the Australian Federal Government when it threatened to 'withdraw all services' unless the governments paid a $100 million subsidy. That was alarming, because a shut-down of all rail services would result in thousands more trucks on already busy roads.

Initially, neither the federal or state government acted on the issue, claiming they would not be "held to mercy" by Pacific National, owned by Toll and Patrick Corporation, "which are extremely profitable multi-national companies". Later, the state infrastructure minister Bryan Green and his federal counterpart, transport minister Warren Truss, announced a $120 million rescue package, designed to ensure that Pacific National would continue operation in the state.

In May 2007, the Tasmanian Government, the Federal Government and Pacific National came to an agreement regarding the funding, ownership and operation of the Tasmanian railway network.  The State of Tasmania was to acquire the railway infrastructure previously leased to Pacific National.  Pacific National would continue to provide rail services on the network. The Federal Government's AusLink program provided $78 million in funding for capital works.  The Tasmanian Government also agreed to provide $4 million funding each year for maintenance.

In September 2009, the Tasmanian Government and Pacific National formally entered into a business sale agreement for purchase of the Tasmanian rail business, with rail infrastructure and railway operations to be maintained, managed and owned by a new State-owned rail company, Tasmanian Railway Pty Ltd trading as TasRail.

Today 

Tasrail has operated the mainline railways in Tasmania since 2009 and provides freight service across the state. It operates twelve DQ class, one DV class, seventeen TR class and one Y class, a total of 27 operational locomotives. It also has various locomotives of different classes in storage.

Heritage operators 
The following table lists railways and museums which run vintage passenger trains and rolling stock:

See also
 Tasmanian Government Railways
 TasRail
 Rail transport in Australia

References

Further reading

External links
Rail Tasmania
National Archives of Australia
A diagrammatic history of railways in Tasmania

 
3 ft 6 in gauge railways in Australia